Teddy Corpuz is a Filipino singer, television presenter, actor and comedian. He is a regular host and judge on ABS-CBN's noontime variety show It's Showtime.

Career
Corpuz first appeared in the GMA Network sitcom Idol Ko si Kap, and later on became Richard Gutierrez's sidekick in the fantaserye Sugo. He later formed the band Rocksteddy.

He also acted in the indie film, Isnats and is also a part of a comedic group called The Cardio Boys. He hosted the programs Shock Attack, Tawatakutan and he currently hosts the reality talent / dance show It's Showtime on ABS-CBN.

He was reunited with Empoy Marquez for the web show Teddy and Empoy Show, with Rizza Diaz as their first guest.

Personal life
Corpuz is married to Jasmine Corpuz since 2006. They have two children named Angelica Phoebe and Theodore John. In 2017. He and his wife renewed their vows on-air during the Magpasikat performance with Corpuz, Jugs Jugueta, and Vice Ganda in It's Showtime.

Filmography

Television

Film

Discography

Albums
With Rocksteddy
Tsubtsatagilidakeyn (2006)
PatiPatopanabla (2007)
Ayos Lang Ako (2008)
Instadramatic (2013)

Singles
Walang Basagan ng Trip  (2014)
Who We Are  (2018)
Praning  (2018)

References

External links

Living people
21st-century Filipino male singers
Place of birth missing (living people)
ABS-CBN personalities
TV5 (Philippine TV network) personalities
Filipino male film actors
Filipino television variety show hosts
Sony Music artists
PolyEast Records artists
Year of birth missing (living people)